Lorenzo di Credi (1456/59 – January 12, 1537) was an Italian Renaissance painter and sculptor best known for his paintings of religious subjects. He is most famous for having worked in the studio of Andrea del Verrocchio at the same time as the young Leonardo da Vinci.

Life
Lorenzo was born in Florence in 1456 or 1459 to a goldsmith named Andrea d' Oderigo. He was apprenticed to Andrea del Verrocchio, probably in the mid-1470s. He eventually became Verrocchio's primary assistant and inherited his workshop on Verrocchio's death in 1488. On Verrocchio's behalf he completed the famous Madonna di Piazza for the cathedral of Pistoia, commissioned to Verrocchio in 1475 but executed by Lorenzo between 1485 and 1491.

Lorenzo's earliest independent works include an Annunciation in the Uffizi, two panels of the Madonna and Child at the Galleria Sabauda in Turin, another at the National Gallery in London and Adoration of the Child at the Pinacoteca Querini Stampalia in Venice. From his maturity date the Madonna and Child with Saints Julian and Nicholas (1493) for the Mascalonzi chapel at the Cestello, Florence (Paris, Louvre), the Adoration of the Shepherds (1487) for Santa Chiara (now at the Uffizi) and the Baptism of Christ for the Chiostro dello Scalzo (now Fiesole, San Domenico). In 1501 he remade parts of Fra Angelico's high altarpiece for San Domenico, Fiesole. Later works include an altarpiece (1510–12) for the Ospedale del Ceppo, Pistoia (now in that town's Museo Civico) and many small religious panels, including an unfinished Crucifixion at Göttingen University and an Annunciation dated 1508 at the Harvard University Art Museums.

 Lorenzo was also a painter of portraits. His most famous is the Portrait of Caterina Sforza, called La dama dei gelsomini, at the Pinacoteca in Forlí. Caterina Sforza was the Lady of Forlì and Imola in the Romagna and later a prisoner of Cesare Borgia. Lorenzo's portrait of her has been the subject of recent attention because of the sitter's resemblance to the Mona Lisa by Leonardo da Vinci. Another portrait by Lorenzo, perhaps of his brother's widow is the panel now at the Metropolitan Museum of Art. The composition of this work is often compared to Leonardo's Ginevra de' Benci at the National Gallery of Art, Washington, D.C.

Giorgio Vasari devoted a biography to Lorenzo di Credi in his Lives of the Artists. Though Vasari praised Lorenzo's art for its high finish, he criticized him for being a perfectionist who was excessively diligent, ground his pigments too fine, and spent too much time distilling his oils.

Lorenzo had many pupils. His most important were Giovanni Antonio Sogliani, who assisted Lorenzo in many of his late works. Others include Tommaso di Stefano Lunetti and Antonio del Ceraiolo. Collaborators and followers included Giovanni di Benedetto Cianfanini, the Master of the Johnson Ascension of the Magdalene (named after a painting now in Philadelphia) and the anonymous artist known as "Tommaso" (also called Tommaso di Credi, the Master of the Czartoryski Tondo or the Master of the Santo Spirito Conversazione).

Lorenzo died in Florence in 1537.

Sources
 Dalli Regoli, Gigetta. Lorenzo di Credi. Milan: Edizioni di Communità, 1966.
 Grossman, Sheldon. “Two New Paintings by Lorenzo di Credi: A Contribution to the Painter’s Late Style,” Mitteilungen des Kunsthistorischen Institutes in Florenz, 14, Bd., H. 2 (December 1969): pp. 161–182.
 Kent, Francis W. “Lorenzo di Credi, His Patron Iacopo Bongianni and Savonarola,” The Burlington Magazine, vol. 125, no. 966 (September 1983): pp. 538–541.

References

External links
Leonardo da Vinci, Master Draftsman, exhibition catalog fully online as PDF from The Metropolitan Museum of Art Library, which contains material on Lorenzo di Credi (see index)

1450s births
1537 deaths
Painters from Florence
15th-century Italian painters
Italian male painters
16th-century Italian painters
Renaissance painters
Italian goldsmiths
15th-century Italian sculptors
Italian male sculptors
16th-century Italian sculptors